A crisp is a type of American dessert, usually consisting of a type of fruit, baked with a crispy topping, hence the name. The topping usually consists of butter, flour, oats, brown sugar and usually spices such as cinnamon and/or nutmeg. The most familiar type of crisp is apple crisp, where apples are baked with this topping. However, many other kinds of fruit can be used, such as cherries, pears, peaches, blueberries, etc.

The dessert is similar to a crumble.

See also
Apple crumble
Cobbler (food)
Dumpling
Pie
Tart
 List of desserts

References

American desserts
Fruit dishes